Sonderabteilung (English: Special Unit) is a German word often used to refer to some special German military formations during World War II. This term was similar to a detachment or battalion.

Several of the formations were created as penal military units composed of disgraced SS troops and criminals convicted of petty crimes.

List of sonderabteilungen (incomplete)
 Sonderabteilung Altreich
 Sonderabteilung Hela
 Sonderabteilung Lola
 Sonderabteilung Nachlässe
 Sonderabteilung Reinhardt
 Sonderabteilung Stralsund
 Sonderabteilung U

See also
 36th Waffen Grenadier Division of the SS
 500th SS Parachute Battalion
 999th Light Afrika Division (Germany)

Military units and formations of Germany in World War II
German words and phrases